Eichstädt is a village in Brandenburg, Germany. It is not to be confused with Eichstätt, Bavaria.

Villages in Brandenburg